Pseudeustrotiini is a tribe of cutworm or dart moths in the family Noctuidae. There are at least three described species in Pseudeustrotiini.

Genera
 Anterastria Sugi, 1982
 Pseudeustrotia Warren, 1913

References

 Lafontaine, J. Donald & Schmidt, B. Christian (2010). "Annotated check list of the Noctuoidea (Insecta, Lepidoptera) of North America north of Mexico". ZooKeys, vol. 40, 1-239.

Further reading

External links

 Butterflies and Moths of North America

Noctuinae